Marta Sanz Pastor (born 1967, Madrid) is a Spanish writer. Her work includes the novels Susana y los viejos (nominated for the Premio Nadal), Daniela Astor y la caja negra (winner of the Premio Juan Tigre and the Premio Calamo), Los mejores tiempos (winner of the Premio Ojo Crítico de Narrativa). and most recently Farandula which won the 2015 Premio Herralde. She is also a noted poet; among her notable works is the award-winning collection Vintage.

References

Spanish women writers
1967 births
Living people